The Magician's Elephant is a 2023 American computer-animated fantasy adventure film directed by Wendy Rogers, written by Martin Hynes and produced by Julia Pistor. Based on the 2009 novel of the same name by Kate DiCamillo, the film features the voices of Noah Jupe, Mandy Patinkin, Natasia Demetriou, Benedict Wong, Miranda Richardson and Aasif Mandvi. Animated by Animal Logic, the film was distributed by Netflix and released on March 17, 2023. The film received mixed reviews from critics.

Plot
Peter is searching for his long-lost sister Adele. A fortune teller tells him to find a magician with an elephant.

Voice cast
Noah Jupe as Peter
Benedict Wong as the Magician
Pixie Davies as Adele, Peter's sister
Sian Clifford as Gloria Matienne, Peter's mother
Brian Tyree Henry as Leo Matienne, Peter's father
Aasif Mandvi as The King
Mandy Patinkin as Vilna Lutz
Miranda Richardson as Madam LaVaughn
Natasia Demetriou as Narrator/Fortune Teller
Dawn French as Sister Marie
Kirby Howell-Baptiste as The Countess

Production
On August 17, 2009, 20th Century Fox announced that Martin Hynes would adapt a novel titled The Magician's Elephant, which was yet to be released, into a feature film. In that same announcement, Julia Pistor was also confirmed as the producer of the film. On December 15, 2020, after languishing into development hell for a number of years, it was announced that Pistor had taken the property to Netflix who acquired the film rights to the book and screenplay to develop the animated feature film, with Animal Logic working on the animation. In the same announcement, Noah Jupe, Benedict Wong, Pixie Davies, Sian Clifford, Brian Tyree Henry, Mandy Patinkin, Miranda Richardson, Cree Summer, and Lorraine Toussaint were all cast to star in the film.

Release
The Magician's Elephant was released on March 17, 2023.

Reception

References

External links

2023 computer-animated films
Films based on American novels
Netflix Animation films
English-language Netflix original films
American children's animated adventure films
American children's animated fantasy films
Animated films based on American novels
Animated films about orphans
Films about magic and magicians
Films scored by Mark Mothersbaugh
Animated films about elephants
Animated films about magic
Animal Logic films